Talofa Airways is a Samoan airline that offers flights within the Polynesian region. It started operations in August 2016 using two Rockwell 690B Turbo Commander aircraft. Talofa Airways is the third airline based in Samoa, after Samoa Air and Polynesian Airlines.

As of September 2016, the airline serves three destinations in the region.

History
Toleafoa Jeffrey Hunter, the founder of Talofa Airways, first had plans to set up an airline business in the region in 1996, when he decided to remain in Samoa rather than return to the United States. After opening a pharmacy in Apia in 2002, Hunter began to invest towards establishing Talofa Airways, which would provide more convenient air travel between Samoa, American Samoa and other islands in Polynesia. He selected the Rockwell 690B Turbo Commander in a nine-seat configuration for the airline's fleet. In order to avoid the high costs of transporting the aircraft to Samoa, Hunter flew the aircraft from Florida himself.

On 22 August 2016, the airline held an inauguration ceremony at Apia's Fagali'i Airport with Samoan Prime Minister Tuilaepa Aiono Sailele Malielegaoi in attendance. Talofa Airways began operations on 29 August 2016, becoming the third airline based in Samoa after Polynesian Airlines and Samoa Air.

Corporate affairs
The airline takes its name from the traditional Samoan greeting Talofa, signifying Talofa Airways' Samoan roots. It is headquartered in Taufusi, Apia. Toleafoa Jeffrey Hunter serves as the chairman and Chief executive officer.

Destinations
As of September 2016, Talofa Airways flies to the following destinations:

Fleet

As of September 2016, Talofa Airways operates the following aircraft:

Accidents and incidents 
 On 12 January 2017, a Talofa Airways Rockwell 690B Turbo Commander was involved in an accident after a normal landing at Pago Pago International Airport (American Samoa). There were no reported injuries or fatalities.

References

External links

 
 Video of inauguration ceremony, 22 August 2016

Airlines of Samoa
Airlines established in 2016
2016 establishments in Oceania